Alive 2007 is the second live album by the French electronic music duo Daft Punk, released on 19 November 2007 by Virgin Records. It features Daft Punk's performance at the Palais Omnisports de Paris-Bercy arena in Paris on 14 June 2007 during their Alive 2007 tour. The set features an assortment of Daft Punk's music, incorporated with synthesisers, mixers and live effects.

The retail release of Alive 2007 in North America was delayed to 4 December 2007 due to production problems. It was released as a download on 20 November 2007, and was released in the United Kingdom on 25 February 2008. The album won a Grammy Award for Best Electronic/Dance Album in 2009.

Content 
Alive 2007 is taken from Daft Punk's performance at the Palais Omnisports de Paris-Bercy, Paris, on 14 June 2007. The performance includes remixed versions of many of their most popular tracks such as mixing vocal elements from "Too Long" with new music, and mixed elements of "Television Rules the Nation" with "Crescendolls", "Around the World" with "Harder, Better, Faster, Stronger" and "Superheroes" with "Human After All".

The album includes elements of the Busta Rhymes song "Touch It", the original version of which was produced by Swizz Beatz featuring a sample of "Technologic". Also featured are elements of Gabrielle's "Forget About the World", the original version of which was remixed by Daft Punk for her single. The encore of the Alive 2007 set features Bangalter's side projects: Stardust's "Music Sounds Better with You" and Together's self-titled track "Together". The special edition of the album includes a 50-page book containing photographs from the tour taken by DJ Falcon, as well as the encore on a second disc.

In December 2014, two vinyl editions of the album were released. The first is standard black dual LP, while the second is a limited edition collectors box set. The box set edition was shipped along with a reissued Alive 1997 vinyl with stickers, dual vinyls in white in a threefold sleeve, and a separate white LP containing the encore. Also included is a large hardback 52-page photo book, an Alive 2007 concert pass replica, a Daft Punk printed slipmat, and a download code for the digital versions of the songs.

Tour 
In early 2006, Daft Punk announced a number of shows. On 29 April, they performed at the Coachella Valley Music and Arts Festival in California, their first US performance since 1997. Thomas Bangalter initially suggested there would be a DVD release of the show, but later said he felt amateur footage shared online was more compelling. Daft Punk later announced shows at Bercy, Paris, Wireless Festival and RockNess in June 2007, the Oxegen festival in July and Lollapalooza in August.

Daft Punk announced a world tour, Alive 2007. They played at the RockNess Festival by the banks of Loch Ness, Scotland, on 10 June 2007 as the headline act in the 10,000 capacity Clash tent. Part of the tent was removed to allow thousands of people outside to see the show. On 16 June, Daft Punk headlined the third day of the O2 Wireless Festival. Daft Punk headlined Stage 2/NME Stage at the Oxegen music festival on 8 July 2007. Their live set was preceded by a showing of the trailer for the film Daft Punk's Electroma. Four days later, the duo played at Traffic Torino Free Festival in Parco della Pellerina in Turin, Italy.

Daft Punk headlined the AT&T stage on 3 August 2007, the first night of the Lollapalooza music festival in Chicago. Their show there was praised by Pitchfork, which wrote that it "was a much-needed reminder of the still-potent power of communicative pop." On 5 August, Daft Punk performed at the International Centre in Toronto followed by a 9 August performance at KeySpan Park in Brooklyn, New York. They headlined the Vegoose festival in Las Vegas on 27 October, along with Rage Against the Machine, Muse and Queens of the Stone Age. At the end of October, Daft Punk performed in Mexico City. They also performed on Friday 2 November 2007 at the Arena Monterrey in Monterrey, Mexico and Guadalajara.

Modular Records announced that Daft Punk would appear in Australia for an event in December 2007 called Never Ever Land. Daft Punk were supported by their regular acts SebastiAn and Kavinsky at the appearances, which had been announced as an extension to the Alive 2007 tour. Never Ever Land toured to Melbourne at the Sidney Myer Music Bowl, Perth at the Esplanade, Brisbane at the Riverstage and finally Sydney at the Sydney Showground Main Arena. A Triple J interview with Pedro Winter (Busy P) revealed that Daft Punk's Sydney appearance on 22 December would be their final show for 2007 and the last to feature the pyramid light scheme. Tickets for the Australian tour sold more quickly than for any Daft Punk-related event in their history.

For the 2007 shows, Daft Punk added the tracks "Burnin'" and "Phoenix" and an encore. Bangalter explained that the 2006 sets were initially designed for performances within larger festivals, but later refined to accommodate Daft Punk shows, saying "The goal was to try and bring a complete global experience to the audience." The introduction for the live show featured the five-note sequence used in Close Encounters of the Third Kind.

Technical elements 
For the performances, Daft Punk used Ableton Live software on "custom made supercomputers" controlled remotely with Behringer BCR2000 MIDI controllers and JazzMutant Lemur touchscreen pads. They also used Minimoog Voyager RME units, which, with the mixers, allowed them to "mix, shuffle, trigger loops, filter, distort samples, EQ in and out, transpose or destroy and deconstruct synth lines". The majority of the equipment was stored within offstage towers during the performances.

The tour visuals were set up by XL Video. The company provided eight-core Mac Pro units running Catalyst v4 and Final Cut Pro. Daft Punk approached the company with their visual concept for the shows. "They came to us with a pretty fixed idea of what they wanted", said head of XL Video, Richard Burford. "They wanted to mix live video with effects. Using the eight-core Mac Pros, we were able to take in eight digital sources and treat them as video streams. Then they could use Catalyst to coordinate the video with lighting effects and add their own effects in on the fly. The final digital video streams ran to LED screens."

Reception 
The Alive 2007 tour was acclaimed. The Times described the set as a "memorable sensory spectacle, both dazzling and deafening" and ThisisLondon declared it "an almost faultless set of relentless electro euphoria". NME wrote that the performance was "a robotic spectacular", while Shoutmouth described the set as "typically triumphant". The tour is credited for bringing dance music to a wider audience, especially in North America. The Guardian journalist Gabriel Szatan likened it to the Beatles' 1964 performance on The Ed Sullivan Show, which brought British rock and roll to the American mainstream.

Dates

Critical reception 

On the review aggregator Metacritic, Alive 2007 has a score of 78 out of 100, indicating "generally favourable reviews." Pitchfork regarded it as "the Ultimate Daft Punk Mixtape", finding that songs from Human After All had been "constantly improved and born anew" for the live set. The sentiment was also shared by AllMusic, stating that "It has the feel of a greatest-hits-live concert, but energized by Daft Punk's talents at weaving songs in and out of each other." AllMusic considered it weaker than Alive 1997. A review by The Star noted that the release and Daft Punk's concurrent tours restored the duo's reputation following the mixed reception for Human After All. The use of music from Human After All, which had received mixed reviews, prompted critics to reconsider the album. The album won the Grammy Award for Best Electronic/Dance Album in 2009.

Dave de Sylvia of Sputnikmusic gave Alive 2007 a score of four stars out of five and said, "Despite a few individual disappointments, Alive 2007 is as exciting a collection of music as any released this year." Entertainment Weekly felt that the live crowd enhanced the positive mood of the performance. Rolling Stone stated that Alive 2007 "loses some of the essential experience" of attending the live Daft Punk events. The Boston Phoenix also felt that the album package would have benefited from more video content, expressing that a key factor of the live show was its implementation of visual elements. In his first positive review for a Daft Punk album, Robert Christgau believed that a full video representation was avoided because "too much scale, flesh and bodily effluvia would be lost." Thomas Bangalter expressed his reasons of not releasing a DVD by stating "the thousands of clips on the internet are better to us than any DVD that could have been released."

On 3 December 2008, Alive 2007 and its single "Harder, Better, Faster, Stronger" received Grammy Awards nominations for Best Electronic/Dance Album and Best Dance Recording, respectively. Both the album and the single were announced as winners during the 51st Grammy Awards pre-telecast ceremony.

Track listing

Chart positions

Weekly charts

Year-end charts

Certifications

Notes

References

External links
 Official Alive 2007 website
 
 

Daft Punk live albums
2007 live albums
Virgin Records live albums
Grammy Award for Best Dance/Electronica Album
Albums produced by Thomas Bangalter
Albums produced by Guy-Manuel de Homem-Christo